The Production Development Corporation (CORFO, from ) is a Chilean governmental organization that was founded in 1939 by President Pedro Aguirre Cerda to promote economic growth in Chile.

Originally, CORFO was responsible for the creation of basic industries during the Presidential Republic Era, namely oil, power, steel, sugar, transportation among many others (see Economy of Chile).

CORFO oversees a variety of programs aimed at generating the economic development of Chile, through the promotion of inward investment and the advocacy of competitiveness for domestic companies. CORFO’s main areas are Quality and Productivity, Innovation and Investment Promotion.

References

External links
CORFO website

Government agencies of Chile
Economic history of Chile
1939 establishments in Chile
Presidential Republic (1925–1973)